Alberga may refer to:

Alberga, Sweden, a locality in Eskilstuna Municipality, Södermanland County, Sweden
Ålberga, a locality in Nyköping Municipality, Södermanland County, Sweden
Leppävaara, known as Alberga in Swedish, a district of Espoo, Finland

People with the surname
Adriaan Alberga (1887–1952), Prime Minister of Suriname
Eleanor Alberga (born 1949), Jamaican composer

See also
Alberga Creek, South Australia, a town in South Australia